The Army Heritage Museum is located in Annadale suburb of Shimla city, India. It is situated in the Army cantonment, close to Annadale ground and helipad.

Description 
Annadale is located in Shimla city, and has the Army Heritage Museum. Annadale is located in the close proximity of The Ridge. It serves as the picnic spot. The museum has a collection of items such as ancient weapons, ammunitions and life history of Indian warriors.

Sections 

The museum has four major sections:

 Heritage Section
 Himachal Corner 
 Shaurya Hall
 Green House

Subsections 
The museum has several subsections:

 Great Military Leaders
 Uniforms of the Indian Army (pre and post-independence)
 Ethos of Indian Army
 Army and the Nation
 About UN Peacekeeping forces
 Arms, Weapons and ammunition (ancient and modern India)
 Flags and bands of the Army
 Contribution of Indian Army personals to sports
 Various awards, honors and recognition provided in the Indian Army
 History of Shimla
 Conservation of Flora and Fauna of the region

Legacy 
The museum also has a Pakistani letter box which was brought by the Indian Army as a souvenir of the Indo-Pakistani war of 1971. It documents 5,000-year-old history of wars and warfare and activities of martial forces dating back from the Mahabharata era till date. The motto and culture of Indian Army is represented through the various items organized in various sections of the Army Heritage Museum. There is a separate section where important achievements of Indian warriors are described.

The history of warriors like Maharana Pratap, Rani Laxmibai, Maharaja Chattrapati Shivaji, Guru Gobind Singh, and Tipu Sultan is shown in the museum. The history of modern warriors, like Field Marshal Sam Manekshaw, K.M. Carriappa and many others is also shown.

The museum also has the surrender letter of Pakistan (1971 war) and Flag of Pakistan. A separate section is there for showcasing arms and weapons of various types.

The collection has ancient items like bows and arrows, swords, spears and also has modern ammunition including AK-47. Army uniforms dating back to pre-independence time as well as after the independence are kept there. Medals, rewards and awards of the Indian Army are also displayed. Many of these medals depict strong bonding between the Royal Nepal Army and the Indian Army.

References 

Museums in Himachal Pradesh
Buildings and structures in Shimla
Army museums in Asia
Museums established in 2006